This list of churches in  Holbæk Municipality lists church buildings in Holbæk Municipality, Denmark. The municipality is located in the west-central of the island of Zealand.

Overview
Holbæk Municipality belongs to the Diocese of Roskilde, a diocese within the Evangelical Lutheran Church of Denmark. It is divided into 27 parishes.

List

See also
 Listed buildings in Holbæk Municipality

References

External links

 Nordens kirker: Nordvestsjælland

 
Holbaek